Slangrivier is a settlement in Garden Route District Municipality in the Western Cape province of South Africa.

The name of the village, which is located 15 km from Heidelberg, means "snake river". It was established in 1838, when Sir George Grey awarded the small settlement to the indigenous community for their loyalty during the Cape Frontier Wars.

References

Populated places in the Hessequa Local Municipality
Populated places established in 1838
1838 establishments in the Cape Colony